Ospitale di Cadore (Ladin: Ospedal) is a comune (municipality) in the province of Belluno in the Italian region of Veneto, located about  north of Venice and about  northeast of Belluno.

References 

Cities and towns in Veneto